Government P.C. College is a renowned college in Bangladesh which is located at Harinkhana, Bagerhat, Khulna Division Bangladesh. It is a National University oriented cum Intermediate affiliated college. Its founder is eminent scientist and philosopher Acharya Prafulla Chandra Ray. This college was established in 1918 and nationalized in 1979.

History
Under the leadership of Acharya Prafulla Chandra Ray, local landlord, local mass and educationists established the foundation of Bagerhat College in 1916-1918 AD. Later the college got the authenticity from University of Calcutta and renamed as Prafulla Chandra College on 9 August 1918.

At the request of Prafulla Chandra Ray, Rishi Kamakhyacaran Nag accepted the Principality of this college. He carried the responsibility for nearly 22 years. Rishi Kamakhyacaran Nag was a maestro of several subjects like English, Bengali, Sanskrit, Physics, History, Math etc. Along with the governing bodies of this college, he went on door to door for collecting money for this college.

In 1924, pupils could avail in the honour's courses like English, Mathematics, History and Sanskrit. Other subjects like Bengali, Economics and Arabic also opened honour's courses. In 1947, after the partition, the college's rhythm got the snail's pace badly but in 1960,the college again opened degree courses for science and business faculty. At that period, the total number of students of this college was about 3,000 and the hostel had the accommodation of 500 students.
The college was nationalized on 7 May 1979. In 1996, the college opened honours for 14 subjects and masters for 6 subjects.

Academic departments
The university has 16 departments under 4 faculties. The faculties are:

Faculty of Science
Physics
Chemistry
Zoology
Botany
Mathematics
I.C.T

Faculty of Arts
Bengali
English
Philosophy
History
Sanskrit
Islamic History & Culture
sociology

Faculty of Business Studies 
Accounting
Management

Faculty of Social Science
Economics
Political Science

Ownership
The college has  of land. Recently it has 8,000 students and 90 teachers.

See also
 Bagerhat Government High School
 Bagerhat District
 Bagerhat Sadar Upazila
 Bagerhat Stadium

References

External links 
 
 www.jessoreboard.gov.bd
 www.educationboardresults.gov.bd
 www.nu.edu.bd
 nu edu bd result
 www.moedu.gov.bd
 www.dshe.gov.bd

Colleges in Bagerhat District
Universities and colleges in Bagerhat District
1918 establishments in India
Educational institutions established in 1918